South Coast Railway Zone (SCoR) has been announced as the newest  railway zone of the Indian Railways and is headquartered at Visakhapatnam, Andhra Pradesh.  The formal notification for operationalization of this Zone is yet to be issued.

Jurisdiction 
South Coast Railway will be headquartered at Visakhapatnam and have three divisions. The existing Waltair division will be bifurcated into two parts. The Andhra Pradesh part of the division, that includes Visakhapatnam district, Vizianagaram district, and a part of Srikakulam district will be merged into neighbouring waltair division. The other part of Srikakulam district will be converted into a new division with headquarter at Rayagada under East Coast Railway (ECoR). South Coast Railway spreads over the states of Andhra Pradesh, Karnataka and Telangana (except Kurnool of Hyderabad division and Jaggaiahpet of Secunderabad division).It also covers a minor portion of Karnataka and Tamil Nadu.

Divisions
 Waltair Railway Division
 Vijayawada railway division 
 Guntur railway division
 Guntakal railway division

Route Length 

The 1,106 route km of the present Waltair division is proposed to be distributed between East Coast Railway – Rayagada division (541 km), Khurda division (115 km) and Vijayawada division (450 km). With the proposed jurisdictions, SCoR will have division-wise route km and Running track km as: Vijayawada 1,414 and 2,631 respectively, Guntakal 1,452 and 2,145 and Guntur 630 and 661 respectively.

Jurisdiction of SCoR after Waltair Division is merged with Vijayawada Division 

Kottavalasa - Kirandul line: Kottavalasa - Araku (inclusive) controlled by Vijayawada division of SCoR.
This is an important mineral route with ruling gradient of 1 in 60 with some block sections prone for stalling of loaded freight trains. Hence it is preferable to fix inter zonal boundary in such a way that either sides of interchange point at a station which has operational feasibility and flexibility in the form of more running lines to regulate trains and also availability of field officers and supervisors for troubleshooting. Keeping these factors in view these boundaries were fixed from 106 km from Kottavalasa to including Araku station.

 Vizianagaram - Raipur line: Vizianagaram - Kuneru(inclusive) Controlled by Vijayawada (BZA) division of SCoR.
 Vizianagaram - Howrah main line: Vizianagaram - Naupada Junction (Excluding) Controlled by Vijayawada (BZA) division of SCoR.

Divisions 
The zone covers the states of Andhra Pradesh, Telangana and parts of Tamil Nadu and Karnataka. It has three divisions:

 Waltair railway division
Vijayawada
Guntur
Guntakal

Performance and earnings 

The zone operates more than 500 trains during peak season to clear the rush of passengers.

Infrastructure

Wi-Fi Stations 

Many railway stations in South Coast Railway Zone are Wi-Fi enabled, provided by Railwire in association with Google which are as follows.

URBAN: Visakhapatnam, Vijayawada Junction, Gudivada Junction, Guntur Junction, Tirupati, Rajahmundry, Kakinada Town, Nellore, Srikakulam Road, Bhimavaram Town, Samalkot Junction, Eluru, Kadapa, Proddatur, Renigunta Junction, Anantapur, Ongole, Guntakal Junction, Gudur Junction, Tadepalligudem, Tenali Junction, Tuni, Vizianagaram, Chirala, Yadgir and Raichur
SUB URBAN: Powerpet-Eluru, New Guntur- Guntur, Duvvada-Visakhapatnam, Anakapalli-Visakhapatnam, Simhachalam-Visakhapatnam, Simhachalam North-Visakhapatnam, Marripalem-Visakhapatnam, Pendurthi-Visakhapatnam, Kotthavalasa-Visakhapatnam, Gunadala-Vijayawada, Kovvur-Rajahmundry, Rayanapadu-Vijayawada, Kakinada Port-Kakinada and Godavari-Rajahmundry
RURAL: Gollapalli, Badampudi, Bhiknur, Bhimadolu, Chagallu, Chebrol, Denduluru, Duggirala, Gannavaram,   Krishna Canal Junction, Mangalagiri, Mustabada, Navabpalem, Nambur, Nidadavolu Junction, Nuzvid, Pedda Avutapalle, Pedavadlapudi, Pulla, Sangamjagarlamudi, Telaprolu, Gundla, Vatlur, Talmadla, Upplavai

Depots in divisions 
The zone has passenger coach care depots at Visakhapatnam, Kakinada, Narsapur, Machilipatnam, Vijayawada in VIJAYAWADA Division. Nallapadu, Guntur in GUNTUR Division. Tirupati and Guntakal in GUNTAKAL Division. Additionally Vijayawada and Gooty have wagon maintenance depots.

Training Institutes 
The zone has training institutes for imparting and learning railway techniques serving both Indian as well as foreign railway staffs at Vijayawada and Guntakal.

Healthcare 
Railway Hospitals which are located in these areas,  Div. Hospital at Visakhapatnam, Vijayawada, Guntakal and Rayanapadu, Guntur have healthcare facilities serving exclusively for the employees of Indian railways and their families.

Loco Sheds 

This zone has Electric loco sheds at Vijayawada, Visakhapatnam and diesel loco sheds at Guntakal, Gooty, Visakhapatnam, Vijayawada. This zone also has 2 Electric Loco trip sheds at Guntakal and Renigunta and plans to convert the trip shed in Guntakal to an electric loco shed.

References 

 
Zones of Indian Railways
Rail transport in Andhra Pradesh